Orocrambus melampetrus is a moth in the family Crambidae. It was described by Alex Purdie in 1884. It is endemic to New Zealand, where it has been recorded from the South Island. The habitat consists of high alpine grasslands.

The wingspan is 24–28 mm.

References

Crambinae
Moths described in 1884
Endemic fauna of New Zealand
Moths of New Zealand
Endemic moths of New Zealand